The River Eamont is a river in Cumbria, England and one of the major tributaries of the River Eden. The name of the river is from Old English (ēa-gemōt) and is a back formation from Eamont Bridge which means the junction of streams.

The river is formed by the outflow from Ullswater in the Lake District, later augmented by Dacre Beck from the west and the River Lowther which carries the water from Haweswater north to the Eamont at Penrith.

The river has flooded on numerous occasions, with the most recent being when Storm Desmond hit in December 2015. During the flooding, 300-year old Pooley Bridge was washed away and a temporary bridge had to be installed to reconnect the two halves of the village. The same storm caused damage to the grade I listed Eamont Bridge, but after masonry work, it re-opened in March 2016. In April 2019 preparatory works began for replacing the temporary bridge with a new bridge. The crossing is to be closed from September 2019 until Easter 2020, while the new bridge is installed.

It is also a strong hold for the endangered white clawed crayfish (Austropotamobius pallipes).

References

External link

Eamont
1Eamont